Laagi Nahi Chhute Ram is 1963 Bhojpuri film directed by Kundan Kumar. The film produced by R. Tiwari and written by Nazir Hussain. The film stars Nazir Hussain and Kumkum. The film music was produced by Chitragupta.

Cast
 Nasir Hussain
 Kumkum
 Ashim Kumar
 Indrani Mukherjee
 Anwar Hussain
 Helen
 Leela Mishra

References

External links
 

1963 films
Films scored by Chitragupta
1960s Bhojpuri-language films